Dwight "Bill" Bentley (born May 16, 1989) is a former American football cornerback. He played college football at Louisiana-Lafayette and was drafted in the third round of the 2012 NFL draft by the Detroit Lions.

High school career
Bentley attended Pahokee High School in Pahokee, Florida, where he was teammates with Pernell McPhee and Janoris Jenkins. During his senior year, he led all defensive backs with 25 tackles, and also had 6 interceptions. Bentley was named to All-Area First-team and All-State Second-team. He helped Pahokee win three Florida Class 2A state championships. He did not receive any college football offers his senior year.

College career
In 2007, he played a season at Dodge City Community College. He did not play that season, garnering himself a redshirt.

Considered only a two-star recruit by Rivals.com, his only scholarship offer came from Louisiana-Lafayette, which he accepted.

In 2008, as a redshirt freshman, he played in 12 games, starting first 10 at cornerback. In 2009, he played in 12 games, starting in 11 of them. He led all defensive backs on his team with 58 tackles and had three interceptions. He was named All-Sun Belt Honorable Mention for his performance that year. As a junior in 2010, he started in 11 games, missing one game due to an ankle injury. He recorded 58 tackles, including 3 for loss and one interception. In his senior season in 2011, he recorded 71 tackles, a new career high, including five for loss, and also had three interceptions. He was named to the second-team All-Sun Belt.

Professional career
Bentley was ranked among the top ten cornerback prospects of the 2012 NFL Draft.  He was drafted by the Detroit Lions with the 85th overall pick., the ninth cornerback selected.

On May 11, 2012, Bentley agreed to terms on a four-year contract with the Lions. On June 18, 2015, the Lions waived Bentley due to injury concerns. On November 18, 2015, the Lions signed Bentley after numerous injuries to cornerbacks. On December 29, 2015, Bentley was waived.

References

External links
 
 Louisiana-Lafayette Ragin' Cajuns bio

1989 births
Living people
American football cornerbacks
Detroit Lions players
Louisiana Ragin' Cajuns football players
People from Pahokee, Florida
Players of American football from Florida
Sportspeople from the Miami metropolitan area
Pahokee High School alumni